The Three Mothers (Italian: Le Tre madri) is a trilogy of supernatural horror films by Italian filmmaker Dario Argento. It consists of Suspiria, Inferno, and Mother of Tears. Each film deals with one of the titular "Mothers", a triumvirate of ancient witches and satanists whose powerful magic allows them to manipulate world events on a global scale, killing anyone who discover their whereabouts, and who are determined to rule the world.

During the 2007 Toronto International Film Festival, Argento stated he had not ruled out the possibility of shooting a fourth film dealing with the Three Mothers. His daughter Asia has suggested that there might be a prequel.

Dario Argento's Three Mothers 

The story of the Three Mothers begins at the dawn of the 11th century, when three sisters created the pernicious art of witchcraft on the coast of the Black Sea. In the years that followed, they wandered the world and amassed great personal wealth and power, leaving death in their wake. 

Both Mater Suspiriorum and Tenebrarum have claimed that the Mothers are Death personified.

In the late 19th century the women commissioned E. Varelli, an Italian architect based in London, to design and construct three stately buildings. From these enchanted, bastion-like homes the Three Mothers "rule the world". According to Varelli's memoirs, entitled The Three Mothers by an anonymous colleague, the architect learned too late of the women's evil nature. (At least six copies of the book are known to have existed. Four may have been destroyed at the end of Inferno.) The residences he designed will become so corrupted that eventually, the land they were built on will become pestilential.

Mater Suspiriorum / Helena Markos 

Mater Suspiriorum, the Mother of Sighs, is the oldest and wisest of the Three Mothers, her given name is Helena Markos. She is also known as The Black Queen; any mention of Helena Markos being one of the Three Mothers would not be made until Inferno three years later.  Lela Svasta, who portrayed Markos in Suspiria, was uncredited. According to Jessica Harper, "the witch was a ninety-year-old ex-hooker Dario had found on the streets of Rome."

Markos, a Greek émigré, was exiled from many European countries and had written several books on a variety of arcane subjects. In 1895, she founded the Tanz Akademie ("Dance Academy" in German), a school for dance and the occult sciences, in the Black Forest outside Freiburg, Germany. The locals feared her, having intuited that she was a witch. As Markos' wealth grew, so did suspicion about her true nature. To avert this unwanted scrutiny, she faked her own death in a fire in 1905. Control of the academy, which became solely a ballet school, was said to have gone to Markos' prize pupil. In reality, this was Markos herself. (As the original Freiburg building "Haus zum Walfisch" the Akademie bears a plaque stating that Desiderius Erasmus once lived there.)

In Suspiria, Markos is the Directress whose presence is concealed by her coven, headed by Madame Blanc (Joan Bennett). A young American, Suzy Bannion (Jessica Harper), discovers the hidden chambers beneath the school after several pupils are killed by Markos' proxies. The aged witch attempts to use her magic to kill the girl, but her powers — including those of invisibility, illusion casting, and telekinesis — prove insufficient due to her feeble state. Bannion defeats Markos by stabbing her through the neck. The witch's death causes the foundations of her home and coven to fail.

In The Mother of Tears, it is revealed that before the events of Suspiria, Elisa Mandy (Daria Nicolodi), a white witch, sought to challenge Markos' evil might. The two battled in Freiburg, and Markos slew both Elisa and her husband.  According to Father Johannes (Udo Kier) in the third film, the battle left Suspiriorum "a shell of her former self". Elisa's daughter Sarah would later defeat Mater Lachrymarum in Rome.

In the 2018 remake of Suspiria, the roles of both Madame Blanc and Helena Markos, referred throughout as Mother Markos, are played by Tilda Swinton. Markos is depicted as an ancient, disfigured, centuries-old crone maintaining control over the coven and seeking to acquire a new, younger body as her current one is riddled in leprous sores, tumorous growths and immobile infants' limbs growing out of her own. In this version, it is revealed in the climax that Markos is a fraud and Susie Bannion (Dakota Johnson) is the real Mater Suspiriorum.

Mater Tenebrarum 
Mater Tenebrarum, the Mother of Darkness, is the youngest and cruellest of the Three Mothers. Her true name is not given; her home is located in New York City and was christened in 1910. The house's number is 49 and bears a plaque that states that Georges Ivanovich Gurdjieff once resided there.

In Inferno, the character is portrayed by Veronica Lazar. She masquerades as Professor Arnold's nurse for much of the film. At the climax, Mark Elliot (Leigh McCloskey) descends into the bowels of her home to confront her. He learns that Arnold is, in fact, the architect Varelli, and essentially Tenebrarum's slave.  Tenebrarum's bloodlust would ultimately be her own undoing, as one of her victims, a maid, was inadvertently responsible for the house catching fire in the midst of her death throes. When Elliot comes across her, Tenebrarum laments cryptically that "It's all going to burn down... just like before." Tenebrarum is perhaps referring to Suspirias finale, during which Mater Suspiriorum is killed and her home eventually burns to the ground. After sealing the room, she laughs psychotically, makes an ambiguous speech, and disappears. However, her reflection remains in a mirror and bursts out moments later as the skeletal incarnation of Death. Elliot flees the room by breaking down the door. Tenebrarum is last seen in her skeletal form, screaming as burning debris of her home collapses around her, apparently perishing in the flames.

 Mater Lachrymarum Mater Lachrymarum, the Mother of Tears''', is the most beautiful and powerful of the Three Mothers. Like Tenebrarum, her true name is unknown. Inferno suggests that her home in Rome, Italy may be located near No. 49 Via Dei Bagni - the Abertny Foundation's Biblioteca Filosofica - when Sara (Eleonora Giorgi) notices a strange sweet smell in the air. In The Mother of Tears, Lachrymarum's home is revealed to be the Palazzo Varelli.

In Inferno Lachrymarum attempted to spellbind Mark Elliot during a music lecture in Rome. According to Argento, Ania Pieroni did not return to reprise her role as Lachrymarum in The Mother of Tears because "she now has five kids!"

Lachrymarum is portrayed by Israeli actress Moran Atias in The Mother of Tears. After the deaths of her sisters, the witch has been hibernating, and is awakened when Sarah Mandy (Asia Argento) opens the urn in which her most powerful relic, a red tunic, is stored. As her minions wreak havoc on the city above, Lachrymarum hides below ground in the catacombs of her Palazzo, regaining her strength. She is defeated when Sarah Mandy discovers her subterranean lair and rips and burns her tunic, causing the Palazzo to collapse. Lachrymarum is killed when an ornamental obelisk from the top of the building crashes into the ceremonial chamber, impaling her.

 Inspiration 
The idea of "Three Mothers" comes from "Levana and Our Ladies of Sorrow", a section of Thomas de Quincey's Suspiria de Profundis. The piece asserts that just as there are three Fates and Graces, there are also three Sorrows. They include Mater Lachrymarum (Our Lady of Tears), Mater Suspiriorum (Our Lady of Sighs), and Mater Tenebrarum (Our Lady of Darkness). The attribute of each woman (tears, sighs, shadows/darkness) is a direct translation of her name from Latin ("mater" being the Latin word for "mother").Suspiria clearly derives its title from the woman delineated in de Quincey's work. However, Inferno's title does not reference Mater Tenebrarum.

 Reception 
 Critical reaction 

 In other media 
 Frequent Argento collaborator Luigi Cozzi made The Black Cat (1989), which features a meta storyline in which an actress hired to portray "Levana, the Mother of Tears" is terrorized by the witch.
 The story of the Three Mothers, and specifically that of Mater Suspiriorum, returns in a reimagined form in Luca Guadagnino's 2018 remake of Suspiria.
 In the 2018 film The Night Sitter'', The Three Mothers are accidentally summoned by one of the children.

References

External links 
 
 
 

Horror film series
Films about witchcraft
Films about cults
Films about Satanism
Dark fantasy films
Italian supernatural horror films
Dario Argento
Female characters in film
Anthology film series
Fictional witches
Trilogies
Fictional shapeshifters
Female horror film villains
Fictional psychics
Fictional telepaths
Fictional necromancers
Fictional characters with spirit possession or body swapping abilities
Fictional serial killers
Fictional mass murderers
Fictional characters who use magic
Fictional cult leaders
Fictional Satanists
Fictional hypnotists and indoctrinators